General elections were held in Thailand on 22 April 1979. The result was a victory for the Social Action Party, which won 82 of the 301 seats. Voter turnout was 43.9%.

Results

References

Thailand
1979 elections in Thailand
Elections in Thailand
April 1979 events in Thailand
Election and referendum articles with incomplete results